The Baltic League was an ice hockey league that existed for the 2000–01 season. The three Baltic countries, Latvia, Lithuania, and Estonia sent teams. The league was not repeated after the 2000–01 season, however, a Baltic Cup was played for the 2004–05 season.

2000–01 season

First round
Group A

Group B
  HK Liepājas Metalurgs –  SC Energija 5:3, 6:4

Final round
3rd place
  Kohtla-Järve Central –  SC Energija 3:3, 7:4

Final
  HK Liepājas Metalurgs –  HK Riga 2000 0:1, 4:1, 1:0

External links
Season on hockeyarchives.info

Defunct multi-national ice hockey leagues in Europe
1